Raymond Robert Johnson (October 16, 1914 – August 20, 1990) was an American football defensive back who played three seasons in the National Football League with the Cleveland Rams and Chicago Cardinals. He was drafted by the Cleveland Rams in the ninth round of the 1937 NFL Draft. He played college football at the University of Denver and attended Wheat Ridge High School in Wheat Ridge, Colorado.

References

External links
Just Sports Stats

1914 births
1990 deaths
Players of American football from Denver
American football defensive backs
American football running backs
Denver Pioneers football players
Cleveland Rams players
Chicago Cardinals players